John Baskerville (1707–1775) was an English businessman.

John Baskerville may also refer to:

John David Baskerville (1857–1926), Canadian politician
John Baskerville (MP for Herefordshire) (died 1577),